My Sister, My Writer, known in Japan as  and abbreviated as Imo-Imo, is a Japanese light novel series written by Seiji Ebisu and illustrated by Gintarō.  A manga adaptation by Kō Narita launched in Monthly Dragon Age from December 2017 to September 2019, and an anime television series adaptation by NAZ and Magia Doraglier aired from October to December 2018.

Plot 
Suzuka Nagami is a beautiful third-year student who excels in her academics. One day, a novel written by her wins a light novel award which is based on a little sister who dotes on her brother. Suzuka decides to give all the credits to her brother Yū Nagami under the pen name Chikai Towano due to her student council president position and their strict father. Suzuka and Yū join a fan service to make progress for her novel, but Suzuka begins to harbor real, forbidden feelings for her brother.

Characters

Suzuka's elder brother. He is a first-year high school student. In his middle school, he became an otaku after reading light novels. Later on, he becomes an author with the pen name Chikai Towano. Compared to his successful sister, Yū is a talentless and an average student. He thinks that he is an untrustworthy brother and mistakenly believes that Suzuka hates him because she is always rude towards him. Deep down inside he cares for his sister, and he has never experienced the feeling of protectiveness and affection (young sister moe) for his sister. 

Yū's sister is an extreme beauty and is perfect in everything she does. Unlike her brother, Suzuka is very popular in school, where she is the student council president. She always tries to become a reliable person, even to Yū. Nobody knows that she is crazy about her brother. When she suddenly desires to write a novel entitled The Story of a Little Sister Who Loves Her Big Brother so Much It Causes Trouble, she asked her brother to become a writer using a false name after she wins an award. Later in the series, after graduating, she enrolls in Yū's school.

Yū's classmate who is a proud writer and beautiful inside and out. Yū is unaware that Mai is the light novel writer whom he praises so much, and is a huge fan of Chikai Towano. She personally meets Yū and tries to find out the secret behind his "talent".

An illustrator from the United Kingdom. Ahegao is a cheerful four-eyed girl with big breasts. She never leaves a chance to make sexual references and loves sexually explicit things. Her favorite one is sadism, which means deriving pleasure from humiliating others. Her pen name is derived from a sensual facial expression usually seen in pornography in the manga.

A professional voice actress who won who was selected in her first audition. Sakura does not have any weak points and can perform in any kind of role. She aspires to become the voice actress for a little sister character, and is also a great fan of Chikai Towano's writing. Even though Yū is younger than her, she loves to pretend to be his little sister and nicknames him as "Onii-chan".

Media

Light novels
Seiji Ebisu published the first volume of the light novels, with illustrations by Gintarō, in 2016. The series is published by Fujimi Shobo under their Fujimi Fantasia Bunko imprint.

Manga
A manga adaptation with art by Kō Narita began serialization in Fujimi Shobo's shōnen manga magazine Monthly Dragon Age magazine on December 9, 2017. The manga ended on September 9, 2019. The fourth and final volume was released on December 20, 2019.

Anime
An anime television series adaptation aired from October 10 to December 19, 2018 on AT-X, Tokyo MX and other channels. The series was directed by Hiroyuki Furukawa, who also adapted Gintarō's original character designs. Yūichirō Momose handled series composition, Kisuke Koizumi was the sound director, and  Yashikin composed the music. The series was animated by studio NAZ and Furukawa's own newly established Magia Doraglier. The opening theme is "Secret Story" by Purely Monster. The series ran for 10 episodes.

Reception 
The anime adaptation of My Sister, My Writer was panned for its subpar animation quality. Brian Ashcraft of Kotaku described the show as one of the most notable production disasters of 2018. According to the credits of episode 2, the most likely reason for the series' deteriorating animation quality was due to studio Buyu being in charge of key animation as opposed to the main NAZ and Magia Doraglier studios. Buyu is a production company that was only in charge of in-between animation and finish animation in episode 1, and the studio usually serves as a subcontractor for other companies. Additionally, multiple individual staffers were credited with key animation rather than individual companies.

Notes

References

External links
  
  
 

2016 Japanese novels
Anime and manga based on light novels
Crunchyroll anime
Fujimi Fantasia Bunko
Fujimi Shobo manga
Kadokawa Dwango franchises
Light novels
Naz (studio)
Romantic comedy anime and manga
Shōnen manga